3rd is the third album by American indie rock supergroup the Baseball Project. It was released on March 25, 2014 on Yep Roc Records.

Reviews

3rd has received positive reviews from critics. Review aggregator site Metacritic has given it a 77%, indicating "generally favorable reviews".

Track listing

Bonus tracks from YepRoc.com

Personnel
The Baseball Project
Scott McCaughey – vocals, guitars, keyboards, bass, percussion
Steve Wynn – vocals, guitars
Linda Pitmon – drums, percussion, piano, vocals
Peter Buck – 12 and 6 string guitars, Fender VI bass, banjo
Mike Mills – bass, vocals

Guests
Josh Kantor – piano and organ (7); Panda organ
Alex Gonzalez (Escoba) – trumpet (3, 4)

Production
Produced by The Baseball Project and Adam Selzer.
Recorded by Adam Selzer at Type Foundry, Portland OR.
Additional recording by:
Scott McCaughey (Dungeon Of Horror, Portland)
John Keane (John Keane Studios, Athens GA)
David Barbe (Chase Transduction, Athens)
David Westner (Woolly Mammoth, Waltham MA)
Gabriel Lopez at T-Vox Records (Mexico City, Mexico)
Mixed by:
Mitch Easter (Fidelitorium Studios, Kernersville, NC)
Sam Bell (Large Portions, L.A.)
Scott McCaughey (Dungeon Of Horror, Portland)
Mastered by Greg Calbi at Sterling Sound NYC

References

External links
Homepage

The Baseball Project albums
Yep Roc Records albums
2014 albums